Cecilia Ragnarsson (born July 3, 1986, in Sala) is a Swedish actress, model  and  beauty pageant titleholder and winner of Miss International Sweden 2010.  Ragnarsson represented Sweden at Miss International 2010 in China.  Ragnarsson also competed in Top Model of The World 2010 and placed in the top 15.

References

External links 
Official website

1986 births
Living people
Miss International 2010 delegates
People from Sala Municipality
Swedish beauty pageant winners
Swedish female models